Redbergslids IK is a now defunct Swedish football club which was located in Gothenburg. They played in the highest Swedish league, Allsvenskan, once in 1930–31, but were relegated. They were also punished for paying their players, which was against the rules at that time, by being demoted to the bottom of the Swedish football league system. Notable players of the club included Gunnar Gren and Sven Rydell.

In the top division of Sweden the club attracted an average crowd of 8,898.

References 

Redbergslids IK
Redbergslids IK
Redbergslids IK